Paján Canton is a canton of Ecuador, located in the Manabí Province.  Its capital is the town of Paján.  Its population at the 2001 census was 35,952.

Demographics
Ethnic groups as of the Ecuadorian census of 2010:
Montubio  49.4%
Mestizo  46.3%
Afro-Ecuadorian  2.1%
White  2.1%
Indigenous  0.1%
Other

References

Cantons of Manabí Province